Galiazzo is an Italian surname. Notable people with the surname include:

Chiara Galiazzo (born 1986), Italian singer
Giuliano Galiazzo (born 1946), Italian rower
Marco Galiazzo (born 1983), Italian archer

Italian-language surnames